In Greek mythology, Idas (/ˈiːdəs/, Ancient Greek: Ἴδας, translit. Ídas) may refer to the following individuals:

Idas, son of Aphareus
Idas, also called Acesidas ("averter from Mt. Ida"), one of the Dactyls who represented the "little finger".
Idas, an Egyptian prince as son of Aegyptus and Hephaestine. He married Hippodice, daughter of Danaus who killed him during their wedding night.
Idas, one of the Ethiopian Chiefs, was in the court of Cepheus when the fight broke between Perseus and Phineus. He kept neutral, but was nevertheless accidentally killed by Phineus.
Idas, son of Clymenus and Epicaste, brother of Harpalyce and Therager.
Idas, an Athenian son of Arcas and one of the Sacrificial victims of the Minotaur.
 Idas, an Elean from Pisa who participated in the foot-race at Opheltes' funeral games. During the war of the Seven against Thebes he came in succour of Hippomedon, one of the Seven.
Idas, a man from Onchestus. He was a defender of Thebes in war of the Seven against Thebes and was slain by Tydeus.

 Idas, one of those comrades of Diomedes in Italy who turned into birds.
Idas, one of the soldiers of Aeneas in Italy. He was killed by Turnus, the man who opposed Aeneas in Italy.

Notes

References 

 Apollodorus, The Library with an English Translation by Sir James George Frazer, F.B.A., F.R.S. in 2 Volumes, Cambridge, MA, Harvard University Press; London, William Heinemann Ltd. 1921. ISBN 0-674-99135-4. Online version at the Perseus Digital Library. Greek text available from the same website.
 Graves, Robert, The Greek Myths, Harmondsworth, London, England, Penguin Books, 1960. 
 Graves, Robert, The Greek Myths: The Complete and Definitive Edition. Penguin Books Limited. 2017. 
 Maurus Servius Honoratus, In Vergilii carmina comentarii. Servii Grammatici qui feruntur in Vergilii carmina commentarii; recensuerunt Georgius Thilo et Hermannus Hagen. Georgius Thilo. Leipzig. B. G. Teubner. 1881. Online version at the Perseus Digital Library.
 Parthenius, Love Romances translated by Sir Stephen Gaselee (1882-1943), S. Loeb Classical Library Volume 69. Cambridge, MA. Harvard University Press. 1916.  Online version at the Topos Text Project.
 Parthenius, Erotici Scriptores Graeci, Vol. 1. Rudolf Hercher. in aedibus B. G. Teubneri. Leipzig. 1858. Greek text available at the Perseus Digital Library.
 Pausanias, Description of Greece with an English Translation by W.H.S. Jones, Litt.D., and H.A. Ormerod, M.A., in 4 Volumes. Cambridge, MA, Harvard University Press; London, William Heinemann Ltd. 1918. . Online version at the Perseus Digital Library
 Pausanias, Graeciae Descriptio. 3 vols. Leipzig, Teubner. 1903.  Greek text available at the Perseus Digital Library.
 Publius Ovidius Naso, Metamorphoses translated by Brookes More (1859-1942). Boston, Cornhill Publishing Co. 1922. Online version at the Perseus Digital Library.
 Publius Ovidius Naso, Metamorphoses. Hugo Magnus. Gotha (Germany). Friedr. Andr. Perthes. 1892. Latin text available at the Perseus Digital Library.
 Publius Papinius Statius, The Thebaid translated by John Henry Mozley. Loeb Classical Library Volumes. Cambridge, MA, Harvard University Press; London, William Heinemann Ltd. 1928. Online version at the Topos Text Project.
 Publius Papinius Statius, The Thebaid. Vol I-II. John Henry Mozley. London: William Heinemann; New York: G.P. Putnam's Sons. 1928. Latin text available at the Perseus Digital Library.
 Publius Vergilius Maro, Aeneid. Theodore C. Williams. trans. Boston. Houghton Mifflin Co. 1910. Online version at the Perseus Digital Library.
 Publius Vergilius Maro, Bucolics, Aeneid, and Georgics. J. B. Greenough. Boston. Ginn & Co. 1900. Latin text available at the Perseus Digital Library.

Princesses in Greek mythology
Sons of Aegyptus
Metamorphoses into birds in Greek mythology
Metamorphoses characters
Characters in the Aeneid
Attican characters in Greek mythology
Boeotian characters in Greek mythology
Elean mythology
Theban mythology
Characters in Seven against Thebes